Kityari is a small village located in Tehsil Adenzai of District Dir Lower, Khyber-Pakhtunkhwa. The village is surrounded by Landaishah (West), Serai (East), Shaban (North East), Khanpur (North West) and Tazagram (South) on main road from Chakdara to Asbanr. The village is 12 km away from Chakdara city, which is located near Churchill Piquet on the banks of the Swat River. The population of Kityari is about 5000 and consists of primarily Pashtun people speaking the Pashto language

Etymology

There are multiple theories about the source of the village name. According to one, "Kityari" is derived from a bird name "kitar rai"; an alternate theory suggests that Kityari  is derived from Urdu word "kaitebari". Due to people occupation(Farming). Kityari is located near SWAT region, which is also called the Switzerland of Pakistan. It is a calm and quiet village or a small town located in the middle of high mountains.

Geography
Allah Almighty has blessed Kityari with springs which is the mean for agriculture irrigation and also for drinking.
The climate is mild in the summer to moderately cold in the winters. High mountains, rich in underexploited mineral resources, surround the village.

North:    khanpur, Asbnr
East:      serai, sabr shah
West:     landai shah, Maina battan
South:   Tazagram

Income sources 

Agriculture is the main source of income of most of the people. Many people are also working as government employees, mostly in the education sector. Most of the females are housewives though some are working in the education and health departments. Young people go to other cities like Pendi, Karachi, Muzaffarabad, Islamabad, Lahore etc., to find jobs. Some people are also working abroad in different countries like Saudi Arabia, UAE, South Korea, Malaysia, Europe etc.

Facilities 

People have the facility of Bank (United Bank Limited Kityari branch), post office, Gov Girls High School, Gov Higher secondary School for boys a kilometer away and naturally play grounds.

Images 

http://kityari1.tripod.com/kityari_pictures_gallery/

Other Links 

https://www.facebook.com/kityare

https://www.facebook.com/BeutifullKityari

See also 
 Badwan
 Chakdara
 shawa
 Asbanr
 Shaban

Populated places in Lower Dir District